HD 1, also known as HIP 422, is a star in the Henry Draper Catalogue.

HD1 or HD 1 may also refer to:
 HD1 (galaxy), the oldest and most distant known galaxy yet identified in the observable universe.
 Plectin, a giant protein found in mammalian cells, for which HD1 is an alias.
 TF1 Séries Films, formerly known as HD1.

See also
 HD (disambiguation)
 HDI (disambiguation)